Farahnaz "Farah" Karimi (born 15 November 1960 in Hassanabad Yasukand, garuss) is an Iranian-Dutch politician. She was a member of the House of Representatives of the Netherlands between 1998 and 2006 for GreenLeft. She is a Senator for GreenLeft since 2019.

Early life and education
Karimi was born in Iran. She received primary education and secondary education in Tehran between 1966 and 1978. In 1978 she went to the Isfahan University of Technology to study industrial design. From the age of fifteen, Karimi became interested in progressive interpretations of Islam of Shariati. Since her youth, Karimi has been involved in the resistance against Shah Mohammed Reza Pahlavi and struggled for democracy and human rights in Iran. Karimi saw the Iranian Revolution as moment to put a form of Islamic socialism into practice. Instead the Iranian revolution brought a conservative government into power.

In 1980, Karimi left the university to join the Mojahedin-e Khalgh, a left-Islamistic resistance movement against the Islamic Republic government. For the Mojahedin-e Khalgh she worked on secretly listening to police communication. In 1983 she fled from Iran to Germany, where she was granted political asylum. Between 1985 and 1986 Karimi worked for the Mojahedin-e Khalgh in Paris where she developed stories for members of resistance from Iran seeking refuge in France. In 1986 Karimi broke with the Mojahedin-e Khalgh. In her 2005 book The Secret of Fire Karimi describes her political development in her youth, her experiences with the Mojahedin-e Khalgh and her break with the organization. The Mojahedin-e Khalgh was formerly considered a terrorist organization by the European Union and the United States of America. Karimi currently considers the organization a "criminal sect."

In Hamburg, Germany, Karimi attended a college for foreign students in 1985. Between 1986 and 1988 mathematics and information science at University of Kiel. Between 1983 and 1988 Karimi was active in different refugee groups in Germany and France. Her sister Farzanah remained active in the Mojahedin-e Khalgh, which cost her her life.

In 1989, Karimi went to the Netherlands with her family. At the University of Groningen, Karimi studied "International Relations and International Organizations". She also obtained the Dutch nationality.

Career
In 1993, Karimi began to work in the semi-public sector. Between 1993 and 1994, she began to work for the foundation Probe in Hoogezand-Sappemeer. Since 1994, she worked as a coordinator for Aisa, a project for the emancipation and support of black, migrant and refugee women. In 1997, she became a member of GreenLeft. In April 1998, she became a board member of GreenLeft. In 1998 she was a national project leader for "Heel de Buurt" of the Dutch Institute for Care and Welfare. Karimi was also active in civil society. Between 1991 and 2001, she was member of the Board of Vluchtelingenorganisaties Nederland.

Political life
In the 1998 elections Karimi was elected to the House of Representatives for GreenLeft. When she became active in GreenLeft, she did not reveal her past involvement in the Mojahedin-e Khalgh. In the House of Representatives, she was involved in the foreign affairs, development cooperation, European affairs and defense. As such, she was vice chair of the permanent committee for European Affairs. She also was member of the committee for justice. In 1999 she was one of two MPs (the other one was Ineke van Gent) who voted in favour of a motion of Harry van Bommel to end the NATO bombings which were part of the Kosovo War.

In 2003, she proposed, together with Niesco Dubbelboer of the PvdA and Boris van der Ham of the D66, to hold a referendum on the Treaty establishing a Constitution for Europe. The proposal became law in 2005. She also questioned the Minister Jozias van Aartsen on the American Service-Members' Protection Act, which obliges the American government to free American citizens who are brought to the International Criminal Court in The Hague -even with the use of violence- and Minister Ben Bot on the Dutch support for the Iraq War. She also took an initiative to support free Iranian Media, Rooz and Radio Zamaneh, with 15 million euro. This was accepted by the House of Representatives at the end of 2004.  Karimi did not put herself forward as a candidate in the 2006 elections.

Karimi was the Executive Director of Oxfam Novib until 2018. In 2009 and 2010 she chaired the SHO, a group of cooperating humanitarian-aid organizations. She is also a board member of the broadcaster VPRO and the IDH (Dutch Sustainable Trade Initiative). Between 2006 and 2007 she served on the board of Parliamentarians for Global Action in New York. In 2007 she helped to establish the Afghan parliament as a consultant with the UN branch UNDP. As an administrator, she was involved with the advisory board of the International Institute for the Study of Islam in the Modern World, among other projects.

For her work, Karimi traveled extensively to many conflict regions. In May 2005, she visited the opposition in Iran. She was interrogated at the Teheran airport and information was copied from her diary. This led to a formal protests by Minister Bot to the Iranian ambassador.

The main themes of her work in the House of Representatives were human rights and international law in foreign relations of the Netherlands. She paid particular attention to the Israeli–Palestinian conflict and the developments in Afghanistan en Iran. She wrote about it in her books Battlefield Afghanistan and The Secret of Fire.

Life after politics

In early 2007, Karimi worked for the United Nations Development Programme, where she was a senior consultant for the UNDP in Afghanistan for project SEAL (Support to the Establishment of the Afghan Legislator): she taught and supported different committees of the National Assembly of Afghanistan. In November 2007 she was appointed general director of Oxfam Novib. She succeeded Sylvia Borren.

Karimi is also active in civil society. She writes for Rooz, a free, Persian online newspaper. Since 2004, she has been a member on the Board of Advice of the International Institute for the Study of Islam in the Modern World in Leiden. In 2006, she founded Bridging the Gulf, a foundation for human security in the Middle East. Between 2006 and 2007, she was a member on the board of Parliamentarians for Global Action in New York.

Personal life
Karimi has been married twice. Her first husband was also involved in the Mojahedin-e Khalgh. When she broke from the organization in 1986 she also broke with him. She has one son with her first husband, who was born when Karimi fled from Iran. In 1989 she was married again. Karimi speaks Persian, Dutch, English, Turkish and German.

Selected works
 Slagveld Afghanistan (El secreto del fuego: mi vida contra el fanatismo islámico/Battlefield Afghanistan) (2006) (Dutch, Spanish and English Edition) 
 Het geheim van het vuur (The Secret of Fire) (2005) together with Chris Keulemans
 In naam van de vrijheid: hoe onze wereld na 9/11 steeds onvrijer is geworden (In the name of freedom: how our world has become increasingly unfree after 9/11), 2021 (Dutch and English Edition)

See also
Iranians in the Netherlands
List of famous Iranian women

References
Farah Karimi

External links

 Drs. Farah Karimi on parlement.com
 Farah Karimi's profile at UNESCO
 Civilian Diplomacy in the Gulf Region. An interview with Farah Karimi
 Farah Karimi's biography
 Farah Karimi Speech at Human Rights Day Seminar, Leiden University, Dec. 2013 (VIDEO)
 Karimi's selected books on Amazon
 Farah Karimi - Green European Journal

1960 births
Living people
Iranian emigrants to the Netherlands
Members of the House of Representatives (Netherlands)
Iranian women writers
Iranian writers
People's Mojahedin Organization of Iran members
GroenLinks politicians
Politicians from Isfahan
Dutch corporate directors
Dutch women in politics
Dutch politicians of Iranian descent